Turośl  is a village in the administrative district of Gmina Pisz, within Pisz County, Warmian-Masurian Voivodeship, in northern Poland.

Notable residents
 Paul Piechowski (1892-1966), Lutheran Pastor

See also 

 Raid on Mittenheide

References

Villages in Pisz County